Snow bunny may refer to:

Snow Bunny, a small snow play area located in Mount Hood National Forest
A groupie in skiing

See also
Beach bunny (disambiguation)
Puck bunny, a female ice hockey fan
Arctic hare Lepus arcticus, species of hare adapted to polar and mountainous habitats
Snowshoe rabbit Lepus americanus, species of hare with large hind feet
The Abominable Snow Rabbit, 1961 theatrical cartoon starring Bugs Bunny and Daffy Duck